Nerys Hughes (born 8 November 1941) is a Welsh actress and narrator, known primarily for her television roles, including her part in the BBC TV series The Liver Birds.

Biography
She was born in Rhyl, Flintshire. Her parents were Myfi and Ted Kerfoot-Hughes, who raised her as a Methodist and sent her to Howell's School in Denbigh, where she took an interest in drama. Her first language was Welsh, although she said in 2009 that by then she had lost some competence. She studied drama at Rose Bruford College  and in 1960 joined the Radio Drama Company by winning the Carlton Hobbs Bursary.

One of Hughes's early dramatic roles was in Ken Loach's television series titled Diary of a Young Man in 1964. She is best known for the role of Sandra Hutchinson in the enormously successful BBC TV series The Liver Birds which ran from 1969 to 1978 with a brief revival in 1996. Her main co-stars were Mollie Sugden and Polly James.

She later played the eponymous lead in The District Nurse, a series which was written for her, and won the Variety Club Television Actress of the Year Award. The series was released on DVD in 2006.

She made brief appearances in the films A Severed Head and Take A Girl Like You, both in 1970. In the theatre she has appeared with the Royal Shakespeare Company, the English Stage Company at the Royal Court, and the Theatre of Comedy.

Hughes was one of the explorers who voyaged to the planet Arg in the (now lost from the BBC) fourth episode of the second series of the 'science-fiction' quiz The Adventure Game in 1981, where she was evaporated in the Vortex game.  She also guest-starred in the metaphorical and esoteric Doctor Who story Kinda (1982) as the scientist Todd, alongside actors Peter Davison, Richard Todd and Simon Rouse. She also appeared in the Torchwood episode "Something Borrowed" as Brenda Williams (Rhys's mother), and an alien.  She is also known for her role as Glenda in The Queen's Nose (1998–2000).

Hughes is married to television cameraman Patrick Turley and has a son and a daughter.

In popular culture
Half Man Half Biscuit released a song "I Hate Nerys Hughes (From The Heart)" on the album Back in the D.H.S.S..

Television roles

Comedy

Drama

Appearances

References

External links
 

1941 births
Living people
People from Rhyl
Welsh soap opera actresses
Welsh-speaking actors
Welsh television actresses
Alumni of Rose Bruford College